Mor Titus Yeldho (born 22 July 1970) is a Syriac Orthodox Archbishop, currently the Archbishop of the Malankara Archdiocese of the Syriac Orthodox Church in North America. He is the fourth archbishop of the Malankara Archdiocese in North America.

Education
 Msc. Mathematics from Union Christian College, Aluva, Kerala
 B.Ed from Mahatma Gandhi University, Kottayam
 Theological Studies from Theological Seminary at Damascus
 Theological Studies from M.S.O.T. Seminary, Udayagiri
 Master of Divinity from Saint Vladimir's Orthodox Theological Seminary

References

Syriac Orthodox Church bishops
Indian Oriental Orthodox Christians
1970 births
Living people
People from Hanover Township, New Jersey
YMCA leaders